I Wish I Was Santa Claus is the fifty-sixth studio album by American country music singer and songwriter Merle Haggard. It was released on October 26, 2004 on the Smith Music Group label.

Reception
The AllMusic review states "It sounds pretty much as you'd expect, especially given the cover art, but this collision of Bakersfield country music and traditional Christmas material has a certain charm..."

Track listing
"El Niño" (Moore, Willie Nelson) – 2:36
"I Wish I Were Santa Claus" (Raymond McDonald) – 2:33
"Christmas in Cabo San Lucas" (Colosio, Dyer, Joss, Williams) – 3:15
"White Christmas" (Irving Berlin) – 3:18
"Jingle Bells" (James Lord Pierpont) – 2:16
"Santa Claus Is Coming to Town" (John Frederick Coots, Haven Gillespie) – 2:15
"Blue Christmas" (Billy Hayes, Jay Johnson) – 2:46
"I'll Be Home for Christmas" (Kent Gannon, James Gannon, Buck Ram) – 2:58
"Santa Claus & Popcorn" (Haggard) – 2:06
"Rudolph the Red-Nosed Reindeer" (Johnny Marks) – 2:34
"Silver Bells" (Ray Evans, Jay Livingston) – 3:37
"If We Make It Through December" (Haggard) – 2:41

Personnel
Merle Haggard – vocals, guitar
Don Markham – horn, trumpet, background vocals
April Anderson – background vocals
Theresa Lane Haggard – background vocals
Johnnie Barber – drums
Doug Colosio – piano, background vocals
Scott Joss – fiddle, guitar, background vocals
Abe Manuel Jr. – guitar
Joe Manuel – guitar
Randy Mason – guitar
Norman Stevens – guitar, background vocals
Kevin Williams – bass, background vocals

References

Merle Haggard albums
2004 Christmas albums
Christmas albums by American artists
Country Christmas albums